This page provides supplementary chemical data on propane.

Structure and properties

Thermodynamic properties

Density of liquid and gas 

Propane is highly temperature dependent. The density of liquid and gaseous propane are given on the next image.

Vapor pressure of liquid

Table data obtained from CRC Handbook of Chemistry and Physics 44th ed.

Spectral data

Material Safety Data Sheet  

Propane does not have health effects other than the danger of frostbite or asphyxiation. The National Propane Gas Association has a generic MSDS available online here. (Issued 1996)
MSDS from Suburban Propane, L.P dated 5/2013 in the SDSdata.org database

References

External links
 Physical and Chemical Properties of Propane

Chemical data pages
(Data page)
Chemical data pages cleanup